Ghislarengo is a comune (municipality) in the Province of Vercelli in the Italian region Piedmont, located about  northeast of Turin and about  north of Vercelli.

Ghislarengo borders the following municipalities: Arborio, Carpignano Sesia, Lenta, Rovasenda, and Sillavengo.

References

Cities and towns in Piedmont